The following lists events that happened in 1907 in El Salvador.

Incumbents
President: Pedro José Escalón (until 1 March), Fernando Figueroa (starting 1 March)
Vice President: Calixto Velado (until 1 March), Manuel Enrique Araujo (starting 1 March)

Events

January

 January – Voters in El Salvador voted for Fernando Figueroa to be President of El Salvador.

March

 1 March – Liberal Fernando Figueroa was sworn in as President of El Salvador. Manuel Enrique Araujo was sworn in as Vice President.

References

 
El Salvador
1900s in El Salvador
Years of the 20th century in El Salvador
El Salvador